Mischococcus is a genus of algae belonging to the family Mischococcaceae.

The species of this genus are found in Europe.

Species:
 Mischococcus confervicola Nägeli

References

Xanthophyceae
Heterokont genera